Allstate was an American brand of vehicles marketed by Sears. Scooters, motorcycles, and cars were sourced from several manufacturers and re-badged with the Sears "Allstate" brand. Piaggio and Cushman were major suppliers of scooters, while Puch and Gilera supplied mopeds and motorcycles, and cars at different times were supplied by the Lincoln Motor Car Works and Kaiser-Frazer.

Cushman Scooters
 1948 811.30 3 hp Cushman Scooter
 1951–58 811.40 4 hp Cushman Scooter
 1951 711.30 3 hp Cushman Scooter
 1954 811.40 4 hp Cushman/Allstate Scooter
 1957–60 Jetsweep (Cushman Pacemaker)
 1958 811.94300 Cushman Scooter

Piaggio Scooters
 1951 788.100 Vespa 125cc
 1952 788.101 Vespa 125cc
 1952 788.102 Vespa 125cc
 1953 788.103 Vespa 125cc
 1954 788.104 Vespa 125cc
 1955 788.94490 Vespa 125cc
 1956 788.94491 Vespa 125cc
 1957 788.94492 Vespa 125cc
 1958 788.94493 Vespa 125cc
 1958–60 788.94494 Vespa 125cc
 1961–62 788.94495 Vespa 125cc
 1963 788.94330 Vespa 125cc
 1964 788.94331 Vespa 125cc
 1965 788.94332 Vespa 125cc
 1966 788.94370 Vespa 125cc (Badged "Sears," not Allstate)
 1966 788.94360 Vespa 150cc (Badged "Sears," not Allstate)

Allstate Automobile

 1951 Allstate Deluxe (6-cyl. Henry J)
 1951 Allstate (4-cyl. Henry J)

Other vehicles sold as Allstates
 Puch mopeds, scooters, and motorcycles, 1954–69 (switched from Allstate to Sears badging in 1967)
 Gilera motorcycles, late 1966 to 1969 (badged as Sears, not Allstate) (106cc and 124cc single-cylinder 4-stroke engines. The 106cc was a 4-speed, and the 124cc was a 5-speed)

External links

Sears Allstate Riders

Motorcycle manufacturers of the United States
Scooter manufacturers
Sears Holdings brands